Jennieffer Zúñiga (born 13 March 1987) is a Guatemalan rower. She competed in the women's lightweight double sculls event at the 2020 Summer Olympics.

References

External links
 

1987 births
Living people
Guatemalan female rowers
Olympic rowers of Guatemala
Rowers at the 2020 Summer Olympics
People from Guatemala Department
Pan American Games competitors for Guatemala
Rowers at the 2019 Pan American Games